Blix is an old noble lineage from Norway and surname. Notable people with the surname include:

Arne Blix (born 1954), Norwegian journalist
Brynjulf Blix (born 1951), Norwegian pianist
Elias Blix (1836-1902), Norwegian poet, musician, and a politician
Gustav Blix (born 1974), Swedish politician
Hans Blix (born 1928), Swedish diplomat and politician
Magnus Gustaf Blix (1849-1904), was a Swedish physiologist 
Michael Blix (1786-1870), Norwegian politician
Peter Andreas Blix (1831-1901), Norwegian architect and engineer
Ragnvald Blix (1882-1958), Norwegian illustrator and magazine editor
Eirik H. Blix (born 1985), Norwegian IT specialist and CEO of Blix Solutions AS 

Blix is also a chemical used in photographic processing - the name is a contraction of bleach and fixer.

Other 
Blix Donnelly
Blix Street Records, United States-based record label

References

Norwegian-language surnames
Swedish-language surnames